Cinder is an open-source programming library designed to give the C++ language advanced visualization abilities. It was released as a public tool in spring 2010 and can be viewed in many ways as a C++-based alternative to tools like the Java-based Processing library, Microsoft Silverlight or Adobe Flash. It is also comparable to the C++ based openFrameworks; the main difference is that Cinder uses more system-specific libraries for better performance while openFrameworks affords better control over its underlying libraries.

Unlike Flash and Silverlight, Cinder is generally used in a non-browser environment. This, combined with the speed provided by C++, makes the library more appropriate for heavily abstracted projects, including art installations, commercial campaigns and other advanced animation work.

See also
 Processing (Java)
 openFrameworks (C++)

References

External links
 

C++ libraries
Software using the BSD license
Creative coding